Cityview can refer to one of two American publications:

 Cityview (Knoxville), a lifestyle magazine in Knoxville, Tennessee in 1984
 Cityview (Des Moines), an alternative weekly newspaper in Des Moines, Iowa in 1992